Suodenniemi is a former municipality of southwestern Finland.

Suodenniemi was first consolidated into Vammala in 2007. On 1 January 2009, Vammala itself was consolidated with Äetsä and Mouhijärvi to form the new named town of Sastamala.

Geography 
Suodenniemi was located in western Pirkanmaa region, and was part of the former provinces of Turku and Pori Province (1917 to 1997) and  Western Finland Province (1997 to 2009).

Villages 
Jalkavala, Kiikoistenmaa, Kittilä, Koivuniemi, Kouraniemi, Lahdenperä, Leppälammi, Makkonen, Pajuniemi, Peräkunta, Pohjakylä, Pyykoskenmaa, Suodenniemi (Kirkonkylä), Sävi and Taipale.

Demographics 

The population density was 6.6 inhabitants per .

The municipality was unilingually Finnish.

External links 

Historic Suodenniemi parish

Sastamala
Former municipalities of Finland
Populated places established in 1868
Populated places disestablished in 2007